Lourdes is a 2009 film directed by Jessica Hausner. It stars Sylvie Testud, Léa Seydoux, Bruno Todeschini and Elina Löwensohn. It received the 2009 Vienna International Film Festival's Vienna Film Prize for Best Film.

Plot
Christine (Sylvie Testud) is a wheelchair-using woman with severe multiple sclerosis. Along with a group of other invalids of varying disabilities she makes a pilgrimage to the Sanctuary of Our Lady of Lourdes in the town of Lourdes, France. Christine is assigned a volunteer helper, Maria (Léa Seydoux) who acts as an aid for her and helps to feed and dress her. Christine admits to Maria that she is not particularly religious but that she has been on several pilgrimages as it affords her the possibility of travelling.

Maria develops a crush on Kuno one of the guards assigned to care for the group. He is, in turn, attentive to Christine. When Maria notices this she abandons her duties and runs off leaving Christine in the care of her roommate who is more mobile than her. That day Christine is able to move her hand on her own.

As the group prepares to return home, the head helper Miss Cécile, abruptly collapses while preparing for the final party. The following day, when Maria comes into her room to dress her for the day she finds Christine already dressed.

The other members of the group are stunned by Christine's marked improvement and encourage her to have it officially recognized by the church. She is seen by a doctor who verifies that, while she still struggles to walk, her ability to do so is outside the realm of what can be explained scientifically and tells her her case will be moved to a committee who will determine whether it is a miracle or not.

Christine is able to attend the last day excursion, which Maria tries to block her from as it was a hike available to the most well members of their group. On the trip other members wonder why Christine was miraculously cured while other, more pious people were not. Christine is oblivious to this and spends some time alone with Kuno.

At the going away party Christine dances with Kuno and then collapses. Though Christine recovers others begin to doubt that she is cured. Standing on the sidelines she initially refuses to sit down. Eventually she reluctantly sits back in her wheelchair.

Cast
Sylvie Testud as Christine
Léa Seydoux as Maria
Bruno Todeschini as Kuno
Elina Löwensohn as Miss Cécile
Gilette Barbier as Mrs. Hartl
Gerhard Liebmann as Pater Nigl 
Linde Prelog as Mrs. Huber
Orsolya Tóth as Child in Wheelchair

Critical response
"The remarkable coup of the film is that it can be taken either as a testament to the power of faith or as a subtle undermining of it." The Independent

Peter Bradshaw, writing in The Guardian newspaper called it 'subtle, mysterious and brilliant', awarding it 4 out of 5 stars.

Frank Scheck, American film critics, writing in The Hollywood Reporter called it 'Moving and immersive, if not quite a cinematic miracle'.

Awards and nominations
 Brian Award at the 66th Venice International Film Festival.

References

External links
 
 Lourdes at Rotten Tomatoes

2009 films
Austrian drama films
2000s French-language films
Films about Catholicism
Film
Films directed by Jessica Hausner
French drama films
German drama films
Best Foreign Film Guldbagge Award winners
2000s French films
2000s German films